Jean Nicolas Louis Carré (19 February 1770 – 1845) was a French general.

1770 births
1845 deaths
Military personnel from Reims
Commandeurs of the Légion d'honneur
French generals